Sergey Ivanovich Lushan  (born 14 June 1973 in Bekabad, Uzbek SSR) is a Russian-Uzbekistani football manager and former professional football defender.

Career

Club
His youth football career began in Pakhtakor football academy at age of six. Lushan first professional club was Patriot Moscow. The most of his playing career he played for Russian clubs Okean Nakhodka, Krylia Sovetov Samara, Rostselmash Rostov-na-Donu and other. In 2007, he moved to Bunyodkor and completed two seasons for the club.

International
Lushan has appeared in 28 matches and scored one goal for the full Uzbekistan national football team since his debut in 1998. He made his debut in a friendly against India on 16 November 1998.

Managerial
In 2008, he finished his playing career in Bunyokdor and was appointed as director club's youth academy. In 2011, he was named as coach Bunyodkor Youth, reserve team which plays in Uzbek Youth League. In 2013-2014 he was head coach of Bunyodkor-2, club playing in Uzbekistan First League. 
On 11 March 2014 he was appointed as new head coach of Uzbekistan U-19 team after Alexey Evstafeev resigned his post.

On 6 June 2014 he left his post at Uzbekistan U-19 team and was appointed as head coach of Bunyodkor. He replaced at this position temporary caretaker manager Alexander Volkov. After match Neftchi Farg'ona- Bunyodkor on 20 September 2015 he resigned and left his post on 23 September 2015.

Career statistics

Club

International

Statistics accurate as of 17 March 2016

International goals
Scores and results list. Uzbekistan's goal tally first.

Honours
Bunyodkor
 Uzbek League (1): 2008
 Uzbek Cup (1): 2008

References

External links
 Russian League statistics at Sportbox.ru 

1973 births
Living people
Uzbekistani footballers
Uzbekistani expatriate footballers
Uzbekistan international footballers
Uzbekistani people of Russian descent
2000 AFC Asian Cup players
FC Okean Nakhodka players
PFC Krylia Sovetov Samara players
FC Rostov players
FC Metallurg Lipetsk players
FC Elista players
FC Bunyodkor players
Expatriate footballers in Russia
Uzbekistani expatriate sportspeople in Russia
Russian Premier League players
FC Bunyodkor managers
Sogdiana Jizzakh managers
FK Dinamo Samarqand managers
Association football defenders
Uzbekistani football managers
Footballers at the 1998 Asian Games
Asian Games competitors for Uzbekistan